Eudoro Melo (1889–1975) was an Uruguayan poet, politician, and journalist.

Works

Literary production
Soul Hits ( 1926 )
Elite which Prose ( 1930 )
Nomad ( 1931 )
Prometheus ( 1965 )

Hymns
Ode To Coast (music by Bernardo Martinez Irigaray . (1930)
Ode to the Red Cross (music by Vincent Ascone)
Hymn to the National Flag
Hymn to the Tree (music by Victor Gamba)
Ode to the Industrial School (music by Alfredo Zipitria Frioni)
Ode to La Paz (music by Victor Gamba)

References

1889 births
1975 deaths
People from Canelones, Uruguay
Uruguayan people of Portuguese descent
20th-century Uruguayan poets
Uruguayan male poets
Uruguayan politicians
Uruguayan journalists
20th-century Uruguayan male writers
20th-century journalists